Barry Siegel (born September 7, 1949) is an American journalist.  He is a former national correspondent for the Los Angeles Times who won the Pulitzer Prize for Feature Writing in 2002 for his piece "A Father's Pain, a Judge's Duty, and a Justice Beyond Their Reach." In 2003, University of California, Irvine recruited Siegel to chair the school's new undergraduate degree program in literary journalism. Siegel is the author of the true crime novel A Death in White Bear Lake, which is considered by many to be a seminal document regarding child abuse. He is also the author of Dreamers and Schemers: How an Improbable Bid for the 1932 Olympics Transformed Los Angeles from Dusty Outpost to Global Metropolis; Manifest Injustice; Claim of Privilege: A Mysterious Plane Crash, a Landmark Supreme Court Case, and the Rise of State Secrets; and a co-author of After Snowden: Privacy, Secrecy, and Security in the Information Age (with Ronald Goldfarb, Edward Wasserman, David D. Cole, Hodding Carter III, Thomas S. Blanton, and Jon L. Mills). Siegel lives in Sherman Oaks and Irvine, California.

References

External links 
"A Father's Pain, a Judge's Duty, and a Justice Beyond Their Reach"
Barry Siegel biographical and Pulitzer Prize information
Official Website
UC Irvine's Literary Journalism Program

University of California, Irvine faculty
Siegel, Harry
1949 births
Living people
20th-century American journalists
American male journalists